This is a list of the largest Protestant denominations. It aims to include sizable Protestant communions, federations, alliances, councils, fellowships, and other denominational organisations in the world and provides information regarding the membership thereof. The list is inevitably partial and generally based on claims by the denominations themselves. The numbers should therefore be considered approximate. Protestant bodies being considered in this article are divided into:

transdenominational bodies with more than 50 million members
international bodies with more than 10 million members
national bodies with more than 5 million members
non-national bodies with more than 5 million members

In 2010, the most numerous international bodies accounted for more than a half of worldwide Protestant population, while the most numerous national bodies accounted for more than 200 of the world's 800 million Protestants.

Transdenominational organisations are very large and often characterized by overlapping membership as opposed to international and national bodies. Some of the national groupings cannot be considered churches in mainstream Protestant ecclesiology even when they constitute a single denomination. A good example is the Evangelical Church in Germany, which differs denominationally and encompasses Lutheran, Reformed and United subchurches.

Lists of the largest Protestant bodies

Transdenominational bodies

Transdenominational bodies include people across all denominations that participate in a movement which goes beyond their Protestant branch, like Evangelicalism, the Charismatic movement, or the Neo-charismatic movement. These are of international scope.

The World Evangelical Alliance is so far the only major transdenominational evangelical Protestant organization that operates internationally. It represents 600 million Christians. The Porvoo Communion brings Lutherans and Anglicans in Europe into a common communion.

International bodies

International bodies tend to bring together only one Protestant branch which shares common founders, tenets and history. Among the most sizeable international bodies are the Anglican Communion, the World Communion of Reformed Churches, the World Methodist Council and the Lutheran World Federation – each with more than 70 million members.

National bodies 
Although there are "mostly national" denominations like the United Methodist Church (mainly concentrated in the United States), or denominations with dispersed membership like the Apostolic Church and the Church of God (Cleveland, Tennessee) (both with membership dispersed around the world) that have a far larger membership than required to be on this list, they operate worldwide and cannot be considered alongside other national bodies like, for example, the Church of Christ in Congo, which operates solely in the Democratic Republic of Congo and is not active beyond that country's borders.

The Church of England, the Church of Christ in Congo, the Three-Self Patriotic Movement, the Assembleias de Deus and the Evangelical Church in Germany constitute the most numerous national bodies with more than 20 million members each.

Non-national bodies

These denominations operate worldwide and cannot be considered alongside other national bodies.

Many sizeable non-national bodies happen to be Pentecostal. The list also includes the largest Adventist church (the Seventh-day Adventist Church), the largest Methodist church (the United Methodist Church) and the largest African initiated church (the Zion Christian Church) and the second largest Pentecostal denomination in the world, The Pentecostal Mission (TPM) or (New Testament Church/Universal Pentecostal Church/Ceylon Pentecostal Mission).

See also

 Protestantism by country
 List of Christian denominations by number of members
 List of Christian denominations
 List of the largest Protestant churches in the USA
 List of religious organizations

Notes

References 

Denominations, largest
Protestant Denominations, largest
Protestant, largest